Alexander John Resa (August 4, 1887 – July 4, 1964) was a U.S. Representative from Illinois.

Born in Chicago, Illinois, Resa attended the public schools of Chicago, Illinois, and St. Joseph's College, Kirkwood, Missouri. He was graduated from the John Marshall Law School, Chicago, Illinois, in 1911. He was admitted to the bar the same year and commenced practice in Chicago, Illinois. He was assistant corporation counsel of the city of Chicago, serving as head of the appeals division and public improvement division 1937-1944. He served as member of the faculty of the John Marshall Law School 1918-1942.

Resa was elected as a Democrat to the Seventy-ninth Congress (January 3, 1945 – January 3, 1947). He was an unsuccessful candidate for reelection in 1946 to the Eightieth Congress. He returned to practice of law and retired December 31, 1959. He died in Evanston, Illinois, July 4, 1964. He was interred in Calvary Cemetery.

References

1887 births
1964 deaths
Politicians from Chicago
Illinois lawyers
Democratic Party members of the United States House of Representatives from Illinois
Lawyers from Chicago
John Marshall Law School (Chicago) alumni
20th-century American politicians
20th-century American lawyers
Burials at Calvary Cemetery (Evanston, Illinois)